Mascagnia haenkeana is a species of plant in the Malpighiaceae family. It is endemic to Ecuador.  Its natural habitat is subtropical or tropical dry forests.

References

Malpighiaceae
Endemic flora of Ecuador
Endangered plants
Taxonomy articles created by Polbot